Pringle Creek is a small watercourse that drains into Lake Ontario in Whitby, Ontario.
It drains .

Groundwater discharge from the bluffs left from glacial Lake Iroquois feed the headwaters of Pringle Creek. 

On June 19, 2017, police and animal control officials were able to contain, tranquilize and safely relocate a black bear who had wandered into residential areas on Pringle Creek.

References

Tributaries of Lake Ontario
Rivers of the Regional Municipality of Durham